The Institut français d'opinion publique (IFOP) is an international polling and market research firm, whose motto is "Connection creates value".

It was founded on 1 December 1938 by Jean Stoetzel, former Sorbonne professor, after he met George Gallup in the United States. Its CEO was Laurence Parisot from 1990 until 2016, who was nicknamed "boss of the bosses", when she was the leader of the Mouvement des Entreprises de France, the French employers' trade union. The IFOP sells polls to firms and political parties.

See also

External links 
 www.ifop.fr 

1938 establishments in France
Marketing companies established in 1938
Consulting firms established in 1938
Market research companies of France
Politics of France
Public opinion research companies